"Jacob's Ladder" is a 1986 song written by Bruce Hornsby and his brother John Hornsby and recorded by Huey Lewis and the News. It became a number-one hit on the Billboard Hot 100 in 1987, the band's third.

Composition and recording
Set in Birmingham, Alabama, the song marries the Biblical image of Jacob's Ladder to someone who rejects proselytizing evangelists and is instead struggling to get through life one day at a time:

Step by step, one by one, higher and higher
Step by step, rung by rung, climbing Jacob's ladder.

The song was given by Hornsby to his friend Lewis and it appeared on the group's September 1986 album Fore!. The song was originally meant for an album for Hornsby that Lewis was producing. Hornsby did not like the version his band played but suggested that Lewis play it that way for his upcoming album. It was the third single released from the album, and topped the Billboard Hot 100 chart for a week in March 1987.

Billboard said that it's "insightful" and "wrestles with spiritual issues."  Cash Box praised the "soaring chorus" and "powerful arrangement."

A music video was filmed of the band performing the song in a live concert shot at the Oakland-Alameda County Coliseum Arena on December 31, 1986.

Bruce Hornsby later recorded his own rendition of the song for his 1988 album, Scenes from the Southside.  It became part of his concert repertoire as well; a live bluegrass-influenced version (very different from the version on Scenes from the Southside) appears on the 2006 album Intersections (1985–2005), which Hornsby performed with his brother John.

Charts

See also
List of Billboard Hot 100 number ones of 1987

References

1986 songs
1987 singles
Huey Lewis and the News songs
Bruce Hornsby songs
Billboard Hot 100 number-one singles
Cashbox number-one singles
Chrysalis Records singles
Songs written by Bruce Hornsby
Songs written by John Hornsby
Songs critical of religion